Brian Jayes (13 December 1932 – 1978) was an English professional footballer who played in the Football League for Leicester City and Mansfield Town.

References

1932 births
1978 deaths
Footballers from Leicester
English footballers
Association football wing halves
English Football League players
Leicester City F.C. players
Mansfield Town F.C. players
Wisbech Town F.C. players
Rugby Town F.C. players